Samuel Landon House, also known as the Thomas Moore House, is a historic home located in Southold in Suffolk County, New York. It is an L-shaped, -story, five-bay, New England Colonial–style residence with a central fireplace and a cross-gabled roof.  It is part of a museum complex operated by the Southold Historical Society.  In 2019, Southold Historical Society installed a permanent exhibition titled "Slavery in Southold" in the Samuel Landon House.  Five enslaved people lived in the house circa 1760.

It was added to the National Register of Historic Places in 2005.

References

External links
Southold Historical Society: Thomas Moore House

Houses on the National Register of Historic Places in New York (state)
Museums in Suffolk County, New York
History museums in New York (state)
Historical society museums in New York (state)
Houses in Suffolk County, New York
National Register of Historic Places in Suffolk County, New York